David Rodgers (March 27, 1936 – August 10, 1993) was an American country music artist. Between 1968 and 1984, Rodgers charted thirty-seven singles on the Billboard Hot Country Songs chart, reaching Top Ten with the hits, "Need You" and "Loving You Has Changed My Life," both at No. 9. In the same timespan, he recorded several studio albums on the Columbia, Atlantic and United Artists labels.

He has three known grandchildren. Stevenne Rodgers, Randell Trice and Danielle Rodgers.

Biography
David Rodgers was born March 27, 1936 in Atlanta, Georgia, United States. He began playing guitar at age eleven, and by age twenty, had been offered a chance to join Roger Miller's band, but declined as he had been drafted. After leaving the services, Rodgers performed at the Egyptian Ballroom for several years, and was eventually discovered by representatives of Columbia Records, who signed him in 1967. Although his first release, "Forbidden Fruit," did not make the chart, he made his debut on the Grand Ole Opry that year. He first charted in 1968 with "I'd Be Your Fool Again," which spent five weeks on the Billboard country singles chart and peaked at No. 69. By 1970, he released his debut album, A World Called You. She Don't Make Me Cry followed in 1971, producing his first Top 20 hit in its title track, while 1972's Need You brought him to No. 9 with its title track.

In 1973, Rodgers moved to Atlantic Records, recording Just Thank Me and Hey There Girl. The latter accounted for his only other Top Ten in "Loving You Has Changed My Life," also at No. 9. 1975's Whole Lotta Livin' in a House was issued on the United Artists label, producing only a No. 60 in its title track. Later on, he recorded Lovingly for Republic Records, as well as several more non-album singles. Rodgers continued to tour the United States and United Kingdom, in addition to charting on the Music Master, Mr. Music and Hal Kat labels.

Rodgers died on August 10, 1993.

Discography

Studio albums

Singles

References

1936 births
1993 deaths
American country singer-songwriters
American male singer-songwriters
Atlantic Records artists
Columbia Records artists
Place of death missing
Musicians from Atlanta
20th-century American singers
Country musicians from Georgia (U.S. state)
20th-century American male singers
Singer-songwriters from Georgia (U.S. state)